Zasole Bielańskie  is a village in the administrative district of Gmina Wilamowice, within Bielsko County, Silesian Voivodeship, in southern Poland.

The village has a population of 746.

References

Villages in Bielsko County